Archie McPhee is a Seattle-based novelty dealer owned by Mark Pahlow.  Begun in the 1970s in Los Angeles as the mail-order business Accoutrements, in 1983 it opened a retail outlet dubbed "Archie McPhee" after Pahlow's wife's great-uncle.

Products
The company's line expanded from rubber chickens to glow-in-the-dark aliens, bacon-scented air freshener, and hula-girl swizzle sticks among other items. It became a popular Seattle tourist destination while maintaining enough countercultural credentials that Ben & Jerry's Wavy Gravy ice cream was introduced at a party on the premises in 1993.

Its kitsch appeal received further national attention from the Librarian Action Figure. In 2002, Nancy Pearl told Pahlow over dinner that librarians like herself "perform miracles every day".  Pearl later posed for a 13 cm hard plastic doll, and librarians from all around the world registered their dismay at its "amazing push-button shushing action!"

Archie McPhee has since been featured in Scientific American's "Technology and Business" review and Time magazine's fifty coolest websites of 2005. In June 2009 Archie McPhee moved from its Ballard location to Wallingford, a Seattle neighborhood on the other side of Phinney Ridge, west of the University of Washington. In 2018, Archie McPhee opened the Rubber Chicken Museum inside its Wallingford location.

See also
Horse head mask

Further reading 
 Mark Pahlow with Gibson Holub and David Wahl, Who Would Buy This? The Archie McPhee Story, Seattle: The Accoutrements Publishing Co., 2008, .

References 

 Jack Broom, "Archie McPhee expands its garden of goofiness", The Seattle Times (June 28, 2004)
 "Seattle Destinations" Frommer's Travel Guide, 2005.
 Brian Stephens, "A new home for Seattle's rubber chickens", The Daily of the University of Washington
 Brian Calvert,  "Able To 'Shush' All Buildings With A Single Sound?", KOMO 1000 News (2005)
 Jack Broom, All booked up: Nancy Pearl's fame continues to grow, The Seattle Times (2004)
 "Outcry over librarian doll", The Sydney Morning Herald (2003)
 Steve Mirsky, "Check Those Figures", Scientific American (2005)
 "50 Coolest Websites 2005". Time

External links 

 
 Biography of the company's namesake, jazz musician Archie McPhee

Companies based in Seattle
Novelty items
American companies established in 1983
Retail companies established in 1983
1983 establishments in Washington (state)
Wallingford, Seattle